United Overseas Bank Limited, often known as UOB, is a Singaporean multinational banking corporation headquartered in Singapore, with branches mostly found in most Southeast Asian countries. Founded in 1935 as United Chinese Bank by Sarawak businessman Chew Teck Weng, the bank was set up together with a group of Chinese-born businessmen. The bank is the third largest bank in Southeast Asia by total assets.

UOB provides commercial and corporate banking services, personal financial services, private banking and asset management services, as well as corporate finance, venture capital, investment, and Insurance services. It has 68 branches in Singapore and a network of more than 500 offices in 19 countries and territories in Asia Pacific, Western Europe and North America.

History
On 6 August 1935, businessman Wee Kheng Chiang, together with six other friends, established the bank after raising S$1 million. The bank was named United Chinese Bank (UCB) to emphasise its links to the Chinese population in Singapore. In October 1935, UCB opened for business in the three-story Bonham Building. In 1965, the bank was renamed United Overseas Bank (Chinese name unchanged) to avoid duplication with another United Chinese Bank in Hong Kong, and opened its first overseas branch in Hong Kong.

In 1970, UOB was listed on the Joint Stock Exchange of Singapore and Malaysia. At the time, the stock exchange had an office in both Singapore and Kuala Lumpur. After it was publicly listed, the bank went through a series of targeted acquisitions. The bank first acquired the controlling stake of Chung Khiaw Bank in 1971, which expanded its domestic presence and also gave the bank offices in Malaysia and Hong Kong. A new logo for both United Overseas Bank and Chung Khiaw Bank was launched in January 1972.

In 1973, UOB then acquired Lee Wah Bank, which provided services in Malaysia and Singapore. In that same year, the bank built a new 30-storey office tower in place of the Bonham Building, which was named the UOB Building (now known as UOB Plaza 2). The company continued with acquisitions, with Far Eastern Bank in 1984, Westmont Bank (now known as UOB Philippines) and Radanasin Bank (now known as United Overseas Bank (Thai) Public Company Limited) in 1999. The bank then merged with the Overseas Union Bank Limited (OUB) in a deal estimated to be worth S$10 billion in 2001.

In 2002, UOB started expanding into the Chinese market by opening a new full-service branch office in Shanghai and upgrading of its Beijing office to a full-service branch.

On 18 January 2019, UOB was listed in the Bloomberg Gender-Equality Index (GEI) for the first time in recognition of gender equality.

Shareholders
The ten largest shareholders as of 1 March 2017 are:

* Percentage is calculated based on the total number of issued ordinary shares, excluding treasury shares.

International operations
UOB has branches and offices located across Asia Pacific, North America and Western Europe, with most of their operations located mainly in Southeast Asian countries such as Brunei, Malaysia, Indonesia, Myanmar, Philippines, Thailand and Vietnam.

Australia 
Headquartered in the UOB Building in Sydney, UOB Australia opened its first branch in MLC Centre as a merchant bank in 1986 to emphasize on trade and financing between Australia and Asia. The bank now has offices in Melbourne and Brisbane, in addition to the branch in Sydney and currently offers merchant bank services comprising current accounts, deposits, lending, asset finance, trade finance, structured finance, cash management, and cross-border payments.

Brunei 
UOB's operations in Brunei started in 1974, under Overseas Union Bank (OUB). When UOB acquired the Overseas Union Bank in January 2002, the operations of the branches in Brunei was handed over to UOB. On 1 October 2005, the bank relocated its branch office in Bandar Seri Begawan.

In 2015, UOB sold its retail banking business to Baiduri Bank Berhad for S$65.044 million. The bank currently provides a full range of commercial and corporate banking services through the branch located in the country. It also operates UOB Asset Management in Brunei, which offers investment management expertise to individuals, institutions and corporations.

Mainland China 

Operations in mainland China first started in 1984, with a representative office in Beijing. Incorporated on 18 December 2007 as UOB (China) and headquartered in Shanghai, UOB has 17 branches and sub-branches strategically located in major cities such as Shenyang, Shanghai, Beijing, Shenzhen, Tianjin, Xiamen, Hangzhou, Chengdu, Guangzhou, Suzhou and Chongqing offering retail and wholesale banking services.

Hong Kong 
UOB opened its first overseas branch in British Hong Kong in 1965, with the branch mainly focusing on trade financing and corporate banking. The bank currently has 3 branches, with a main branch offering full personal and corporate banking services.

In the past 2 of the Hong Kong branches were under the subsidiary Chung Khiaw Bank.

India 
In December 2009, UOB opened its first branch in Mumbai, offering retail and wholesale banking services, including lending, treasury and trade finance products, to corporates, financial institutions and consumers.

Indonesia 
UOB Indonesia was founded on 31 August 1956 as PT Bank Buana Indonesia. Headquartered in Jakarta, the bank offers commercial banking and treasury services, such as deposits taking, loans to small and medium enterprises, and foreign exchange transactions. The company also offers various fee-based services, such as purchase and sale of travellers cheques and banknotes. It has a network of 41 branches, 172 sub-branches and 173 ATMs located across 30 cities in Indonesia.

Japan 
Founded in December 1972, UOB Japan offers wholesale services including corporate banking, debt securities investments, treasury, trade finance, current accounts and banknotes trading. UOB has 1 branch in Tokyo. Operations of OUB in Tokyo was also integrated in 2002 when UOB acquired the bank in 2002.

Malaysia 

Incorporated in 1993, UOB Malaysia was integrated with Lee Wah Bank in 1994 to operate as a single entity. Lee Wah Bank was founded in 1920 in Singapore, with its first Malaysian branch opened in 1956. In 1973, Lee Wah Bank became a wholly owned subsidiary of UOB and was merged with UOB Malaysia in 1994. In 1997, UOB Malaysia merged with Chung Khiaw Bank (Malaysia) before merging with OUB Malaysia in 2002 to centralise its operations in Malaysia.

The bank offers commercial and personal financial services: deposits, unit trusts, UOB Bancassurance, privilege banking, e-banking, commercial lending, investment banking, treasury services, trade services, home loans, debit and credit cards, wealth management, structured investment, general insurance and life insurance.

Myanmar 
UOB opened its Yangon branch in Myanmar on 4 May 2015.

Philippines 
In November 1999, UOB bought a 60% stake in a local bank, Westmont Bank and the bank was renamed UOB Philippines. In July 2002, UOB increased it stake to 100%, resulting in UOB Philippines becoming a wholly owned subsidiary of the banking group. In 2006, UOB Philippines's 66 bank branches were sold to Banco De Oro Universal Bank and the bank ceased to be a commercial bank, with its license converted into a thrift bank license.

In August 2015, Bangko Sentral ng Pilipinas, the central bank of the Philippines, approved the bank's application for a commercial bank license, and in the following year UOB Philippines opened its first commercial branch in Manila, being the 6th foreign bank in the Philippines to receive the license.

South Korea 
In 1983, UOB opened its first representative office in Seoul and in 1998, the bank has a total of S$81 million assets in South Korea. The bank currently operates a branch in Seoul.

Thailand 

UOB merged Radanasin Bank with Bank of Asia in 2005 with 154 branches across Thailand.

Vietnam 
UOB obtained the FOSB licence to grow in Vietnam in July 2017.

United States 
UOB is represented in the US by two agencies located in Los Angeles and New York. Both agencies provide services such as syndicated loan participations, corporate/commercial loans, asset swaps and deposits.

Canada 
United Overseas Bank (Canada) was originally established in 1986 as a Schedule II wholly-owned subsidiary of United Overseas Bank Limited, in Singapore. In 2002, United Overseas Bank (Canada) was converted to a Full Service Foreign Bank Branch (Schedule III), operating under the name United Overseas Bank Limited, in Vancouver, British Columbia.

United Kingdom 
UOB established a presence in the United Kingdom in 1975 in London. The UOB London Branch provides wholesale banking services including loans, deposits, trade finance, treasury and general account services.

Subsidiaries and joint ventures
All subsidiaries are headquartered in UOB Plaza, Singapore
Subsidiaries
 Far Eastern Bank Limited
 UOB Bullion and Futures Limited
UOBBF Clearing Limited
 United Overseas Insurance Limited
 UOB Asia Investment Partners Pte. Ltd.
 UOB Asset Management Ltd
 UOB-SM Asset Management Pte. Ltd.
 UOB Venture Management Private Limited

Joint ventures
 United Orient Capital Pte. Ltd

Associates 
 UOB-Kay Hian Holdings Limited

Digital banking
On 14 February 2019, UOB announced that it will launch TMRW (the first mobile-only bank) with Thailand the first country to get this service. More ASEAN countries will get this service in the coming months, in a push to cater to millennials who mainly use mobile phones for banking. UOB aims to attract three to five million users for this service in the next five years. The service launched in March that year.

On 3 August 2020, UOB launched TMRW in Indonesia after alluding to it earlier on 21 February. Subsequently on 28 September 2021, UOB announced a $500 million boost in digital banking investments over the next five years to double its digital customers to seven million by 2026 and expand digital offerings in Singapore and ASEAN. This will include combining UOB Mighty app with the TMRW app to form the UOB TMRW app, which will be launched in Singapore by the fourth quarter of 2021. The app was first given to UOB employees as a pilot. In addition, digital banking services will be unified in countries like Malaysia and Vietnam.

See also

 UOB Plaza
 List of banks in Singapore

References

Banks of Singapore
Banks established in 1935
Singaporean brands
Multinational companies headquartered in Singapore
1935 establishments in Singapore
Companies listed on the Singapore Exchange